The Write Environment is a documentary series hosted by Jeffrey Berman. It is produced by Amy Gollnick; the executive producer is Jeffrey Berman. The series, which premiered in November 2008, is produced and distributed by RDRR Productions.

About the program

The series goes behind the scenes into the world of screenwriting and screenwriters: their inspirations and their creative processes.

Guests
 Joss Whedon
 Damon Lindelof
 Tim Kring
 Sam Simon
 Philip Rosenthal
 Doug Ellin
 Tim Minear
 Robert Hewitt Wolfe
 David Hayter
 Jay Kogen
 Marv Wolfman
 Mark Waid
 Geoff Johns

References

Additional Sources
 An Hour With Joss January 1, 2009
 Enter The Write Environment November 2008
 Write On! Online, The Write Environment Query Contest May 2009

External links
The Write Environment official website

2008 American television series debuts
2000s American documentary television series